Verville Racer Aircraft can refer to

Verville-Packard R-1 Racer - Verville VCP modified to use in the Pulitzer Trophy races
Verville-Sperry R-3 Racer